"Stay" is a song recorded by American country music duo Sugarland.  It was released in September 2007 as the fourth and final single from their album Enjoy the Ride (see 2006 in country music). Overall, the song is the group's eighth single to enter the Billboard Hot Country Songs charts, where it reached a peak position of #2 for four weeks, stuck behind Taylor Swift's "Our Song", and has become their signature song. The music video for "Stay" was ranked #10 on CMT's 100 Greatest Videos.

In addition, it is the first song in Sugarland's career to be written solely by Jennifer Nettles.

"Stay" was certified Gold by the RIAA on February 21, 2008. It was later Sugarland's first single to earn a Platinum certification on March 24, 2009.  It reached over two million in sales in 2013, and has sold 2,219,000 copies as of February 2016.

"Stay" was voted the fourth greatest video of the decade on CMT.com

Content
"Stay" is a ballad of infidelity, taking the perspective of the mistress of a man who is cheating on his wife. It begins with the mistress's insistence that the man stay with her — even if his wife should call and ask where he is — because she (the mistress) is "so tired of being lonely". Although the man tells her that he will leave his wife for her, she refuses to believe him, telling him that "it's too much pain to have to bear / To love a man you have to share".

In the third verse, the mistress then changes her mind; according to Nettles, she (the woman in the song) "has her own sense of redemption and realizes she deserves more than being with someone who will never be fully hers". This change is revealed in the final chorus.

In the song, Nettles' vocals are accompanied by Kristian Bush (Sugarland's other member) on acoustic guitar; unlike most other Sugarland songs, Bush does not sing harmony vocals. The only other instrumentation in the song is an organ, played by Bush's brother Brandon.

Inspiration
According to Nettles, "Stay" was inspired by Reba McEntire's 1986 single "Whoever's in New England", a ballad in which a wife addresses her unfaithful husband. After hearing the song, Nettles thought that it would be an original approach to take the perspective of the "other woman" (i.e., the mistress), as very few country songs had ever done so. Once she decided to take that perspective, the song "practically wrote itself".
The melody is similar to the Lonestar song "I'm Already There."

Awards
"Stay" has received numerous awards for Sugarland and Jennifer Nettles, as a writer. Most notable has been at the 51st Grammy Awards where it won "Best Country Performance by a Duo or Group with Vocal" and "Best Country Song". At the 2008 ACM Awards it won two awards for "Song of the Year" and "Single of the Year". At the 2008 CMA Awards it won "Song of the Year" and at the 2008 CMT Music Awards it won "Duo Video of the Year".

Music video
Directed by Shaun Silva, the video for "Stay," features Nettles & Bush performing the song in front of an all-black background. According to Nettles, "We wanted to keep the video simple, but still show emotion, so we decided to base the video on performance, and that's all."

Chart performance

Year-end charts

Ronan Keating version

In 2009, Irish pop singer and Boyzone frontman Ronan Keating released a cover version of the song as the lead single from his sixth studio album, Winter Songs. It was not an international hit like his previous singles, and his version of the song failed to make the Top 100 of the UK Singles Chart, peaking at #129 after one week on the chart.

Track listing
 "Stay" (Radio Edit) - 3:17

Chart performance

References

2000s ballads
2007 singles
2009 singles
Sugarland songs
Music videos directed by Shaun Silva
Songs written by Jennifer Nettles
Country ballads
Ronan Keating songs
Pop ballads
Song recordings produced by Byron Gallimore
Song recordings produced by Stephen Lipson
Mercury Nashville singles
Polydor Records singles
2006 songs
Songs about infidelity